Zygopteridaceae is a family of ferns or fern-like plants which lived from the Frasnian to the Berriasian (possibly as far as Cenomanian). It was first thought to have gone extinct during the Permian or the Triassic, but fossil wood assigned to Yulebacaulis was found in rocks from Queensland which are at least Berriasian in age, and palynological records indicates that the family may have survived until Mid-Cretaceous.

Description
Zygopteridacean ferns were mostly herbaceous, with small weak stems and small fronds. Some genera, however, were up to 10 feet tall, with medium-sized trunks supported by a large mantle of roots and fronds reaching up to 5ft long.

They had a cosmopolitan distribution, being found both in Laurasia and Gondwana.

References
 Thomas N. Taylor, Edith L. Taylor, Michael Krings: Paleobotany. The Biology and Evolution of Fossil Plants. Second Edition, Academic Press 2009, p. 408-418.

Fern families
Carboniferous plants
Permian plants
Mississippian first appearances
Permian extinctions
Prehistoric plant families
Ferns